Frank Wang may refer to:

 Frank Wang (entrepreneur) (born 1980), Chinese businessman
 Frank Zhigang Wang, professor of future computing